The Minister of Social Development is a Minister in the Cabinet of South Africa who is the political head of the Department of Social Development and its agencies, including the South African Social Security Agency. The incumbent Minister is Lindiwe Zulu and her deputy is Henrietta Bogopane-Zulu.

The Ministry was created in June 1999 when Thabo Mbeki took office as President of South Africa in the 1999 general election. Its precursor in the cabinet of Nelson Mandela was the Ministry for Welfare and Population Development, where Geraldine Fraser-Moleketi was incumbent from June 1996 to June 1999.

List of Ministers

References

External link
Department of Social Development

Lists of political office-holders in South Africa